Archery at the 2015 Summer Universiade was held in International Archery Center, Gwangju, South Korea from July 4 to 8, 2015. Four competitions were held in men and women's recurve and in men and women's compound.

Medalists

Recurve

Compound

Medal table

References

External links
Schedule and results

Summer Universiade
2015 Summer Universiade events
International archery competitions hosted by South Korea
Archery at the Summer Universiade